Sevilla is a town and municipality in the Valle del Cauca Department, Colombia. Widely recognized and famous as one of the best Colombian coffee producers. It is also known as the "Coffee Capital of Colombia" In 2003, the municipality had a population of approximately 60,000.

History
Founded as San Luis in 1903 by Heraclio Uribe Uribe, it was renamed for the city of Sevilla, Spain, when it became a municipality in 1914.

Geography and climate
Sevilla is located in the northeastern portion of the Valle del Cauca Department, about 90 miles northeast of Cali, the department capital. Sevilla lies on the western slope of the central mountain range, the Cordillera Central, out of the three main ones resting on the beautiful landscape of Colombia. The landscape is also appropriate for long walks and horseback riding. Its climate is widely varied because it is located 1650 metres above sea level.

Population

According to the National census taken in 1993, Sevilla municipality had a population of 47,283, distributed as follows: men: 26,128; women: 21,155; the municipal seat had a population of 19,311. This amount was considered low as the National Census taken in 1985 gave as a result a similar amount. We mustn't forget that on 1928 the town had a population of 22,000; then, according to National Census taken on 1961 the municipality had a population of 56,793 and was listed as the fourth most populous in the department. The last National Census, taken on 2005 gave a population of 41,632, which represented a diminished rate of growth population. In accordance with the National Administrative Department of Statistics (DANE), on 2010, Sevilla might have a population of 46,507.

Resources
There is a great variety of agricultural products as a result of its diversity on climate floors. Citrus fruits, banana, sugar cane, maize, yucca, and vegetables, among others, are abundantly produced. Cafe cultures surround the town, since the farms outside the population core are coffee producers. There are also gold, silver, and platinum mines nearby.

Recent Trends

References

External links
 Alcaldía Municipal de Sevilla
 Sevillanos Unidos
 >censo2005

Municipalities of Valle del Cauca Department
Populated places established in 1903
1903 establishments in Colombia